Pfannkuch is a German surname, meaning "pancake". Notable people with the name include:
 (1898–1965), German book editor
Maxine Pfannkuch, New Zealand statistics educator
Orville E. Pfannkuch, US Marine Corps Corporal, in List of Navy Cross recipients for World War II
Thomas Pfannkuch (born 1970), German footballer and football manager
 (1841–1923), German politician and trade unionist

See also
Pfannkuchen (disambiguation)